Volleybalclub Aquacare Halen is a volleyball club based in Halen, Belgium. 

The men's A squad currently plays in the Liga, the highest level of Belgian men's volleyball. The club has been there since 2002. Their best league position was 5th, achieved in 2004-05, 2006-07 and 2007-08. Because of this, the team has already played three times in the Challenge Cup, formerly known as CEV Cup.

The club was founded in 2002 as a result of a merger between Schuvoc Herk-de-Stad en Halen VC. Those two teams also were the result of earlier mergers.

The men's B and C squad, as well as the three women's teams, play in the lower, provincial leagues.

2010-11 squad
Coach:  Johan Isacsson

External links
Official site 

 

Belgian volleyball clubs